Mahakuta Pillar, also known as Makuta pillar, Magada stambha or Mangalesa Dharma Jayastambha, is a deep red sandstone pillar with an early 7th-century inscription of Early Western Chalukya era. It was found near Mahakuta group of Hindu temples near Badami, Karnataka, India. Inscribed with 16 lines of Sanskrit in Old Kannada script by king Mangalesha, it is an important and partly disputed source of historic information about the times of Badami Chalukya, the dynasty, and his influential father Pulakeshin I.

Location
The pillar was found in the 19th-century lying on the ground near the ruins of Mahakutesvara temple, one of the 7th-century group of temples at the Mahakuta natural springs (Bagalkot district). Its significance was re-discovered by colonial era archaeologists and scholars in the 1880s. The pillar was moved to Bijapur about 1920, and is now housed in the Gol Gumbaz Archaeological Museum, Vijayapura, Karnataka.

The historical location of the Mahakuta pillar has been unclear. Cousens and early scholars presumed that it was always near the Mahakuta pushkarni (natural springs tank). However, George Michell and Carol Bolon questioned this assumption. Bolon proposed that it may have been near an old temple that exists near the cliff (hill top) about a kilometer away. The problem with this suggestion is that the architecture and artwork at the cliff temple is far more crude than the remarkable finish of the Mahakuta pillar, making it likely that the cliff temple is considerably more older. According to Gary Tartakov, the temple now called Bananti Gudi is more likely site where the pillar used to be. This small two-level historic Dravida architecture temple is more consistent with the chronology, iconography and the pillar artwork, as well much closer to where Fleet found the pillar in 1880–1.

Description
The Mahakuta pillar is made of fine grained, deep red sandstone. The inscription consists of sixteen lines, each spirally wrapped around the sixteen faces averaging four letters per face. The pillar has no base molding. It is topped with a small amalaka with thirty six deep flutes. On the top of this amalaka is a carved box with flower decoration on the sides and lotus palmette corners.

Mahakuta is the modern era name of the site where this pillar was found. Its earlier name, as stated in lines 9–10 of the inscription was Makuta, with Magada as the local vernacular alternate. This is not a mistake of the lipikara (scribe), because lines 13–14 repeat this term with Makutesvaranatha as the name of the temple. The pillar itself is called Dharma Jayastambha (dharma victory pillar) in the inscription. The inscription shows no signs of mutilation, only natural erosion over nearly 1,400 years. The scribe identifies the end of each line by repeating or double-repeating an aksara (letter). The Sanskrit is not perfect in the classical sense, but of a good quality with occasional mistakes. The composers tried to create metric shlokas, but lines such as 3 and 4 are not in accurate meter.

This is a "Saiva inscription", states Fleet. The pillar's primary aim is to declare the gift of an additional ten villages to the Shiva temple called Makutesvaranatha", one that already existed in 602 CE.

Date
Lines 13–14 of the inscription allude to the date of the inscription, as "the fifth glorious year, of the constantly augmenting reign of Mangalesha, in the current Siddharatha (samvatsara) on the full moon tithi of the month Vaisakha". Scholars have interpreted this in different ways because there are several Hindu calendars and it is not obvious which one to apply here. Furthermore, the inscription uses the start of Mangalesha's reign as reference and it is unclear what that reference year should be. According to Fleet, there are three possible dates:
if they were using the southern Luni-solar calendar in early 7th century, this gives samvat 522
the mean-sign system of the southern Hindu calendar this would be samvat 524 in the southern calendar, the equivalent of April 602 CE (per the Vaisakha month)
the northern Luni-solar calendar gives a date in saka samvat 525

Fleet discusses alternate dates ranging between 595 CE and 602 CE, largely based on other inscriptions and texts, preferring 602 CE. Other scholars use a combination of inscriptions and texts to determine a different reference year. Thus, KR Ramesh dates it to 595–596 CE, while Carol Bolon dates it to 602 CE.

Inscription and translation
The sixteen lines of the inscription on the Mahakuta pillar was first translated by John Fleet and published in 1889. His translation is given below:

Significance
The Mahakuta pillar and its date is important as it helps date other dynasties mentioned, the chronology of kings within the Early Western Chalukya dynasty, how and when the different temple architecture styles evolved in Badami-Mahakuta-Pattadakal-Aihole region of Karnataka.

At first blush, the pillar was linked to the temple it was found near, namely the Mahakutesvara temple. However, this is a fairly sophisticated form of Dravida architecture. It led to theories that the Dravida architecture was quite advanced by 602 CE. The colonial era archaeologist and historian Henry Cousens stated that the fine, fluted Mahakuta pillar suggests that construction techniques were fairly advanced, and therefore likely went with the advanced Mahakutesvara temple near where it was found. George Michell and others questioned this, and suggested that the pillar may be referring to an older temple with the same name, one mentioned by Fleet and Cousens in their footnotes of 1880s publications. In the late 1970s, Carol Bolon identified two temples, one named Hire Mahakutesvara (elder temple near the hill top nearby, likely completed between 565–602 CE) and the other Hosa Mahakutesvara (larger temple near the Mahakuta natural springs tank, likely completed in the second half of the 7th-century, close to 685 CE). Bolon's chronology fits better with generally accepted chronology of Dravida architecture.

According to the Mahakuta pillar inscription, the dynasty commenced with Jayasimha I, followed by Ranaraga. Then came Pulakeshin I who had two sons, Kirtivarman I and Mangalesha. The inscription does not mention the word Pulakeshin I, Line 4 of the inscription confirms that Pulakeshin I was also called Ranavikrama (lit. valorous in war) and Satyashraya (lit. home of truth).} 

Some of the conquests, wars and attacks mentioned in the Mahakuta pillar inscription has been used as a reliable record. The inscription states, for example, that Kirtivarman I conquered many kingdoms such as Vanga, Kalinga (Odisha and nearby regions), Anga, Vattura, Magadha (Bihar and nearby region), Madraka, Kerala (Southwest coastline), Gangas, Mushaka (Malabar and nearby), Pandya, Dramila, Choliya (Chola, Tamil Nadu and nearby), Aluka (Alupas) and Vaijayanti (Banavasi).} However, scholars generally dismiss much in this inscription as fiction or exaggeration. These claims are unreliable, states K.V. Ramesh, as they not supported by inscriptions, texts and later records found in and away from Early Western Chalukya region. According to Ramesh, Kirtivarman may have conquered only the Alupas in coastal Karnataka, the Banavasi Kadambas and the Mauryas of Konkan and he dismisses the rest as exaggeration. 

According to Dineshchandra Sircar, historic texts and prashasti inscriptions, such as the one in the Mahakuta pillar, mix historical truths with too much fabrication in their attempt to flatter and eulogize their rulers for the gifts they received in turn. These exaggerations and allegations limit their historical value and must be used with a lot of care. It is "impossible to believe", states Sircar, that Kirtivarman I even invaded all the kingdoms mentioned in this inscription because they are so far from the Badami-region in different directions. Furthermore, other inscriptions of this same dynasty, including one issued during the rule of his own son Pulakesin II contradict this wildly exaggerated claims. Thus, many parts of this inscription cannot be taken at face value or being even partially true, but reflect mere "imagination" and "fabrication" by the beneficiary of the gift and his scribe.

According to Harle, there may be some useful information in the Mahakuta pillar. For example, given the controversies and disagreements on relative chronology of Dravida architecture, the Mahakuta pillar "probably" provides a terminus ante quem'' (early 6th-century) for the construction of the early temples in this region and the Mahakutesvara temple. Similarly, it is another source for establishing the use of Sanskrit and the popular epithets in 6th-century for eulogized kings.

According to Tratakov, for Indian architecture historians, the Mahakuta pillar is an important monument. It helps set a chronology for the innovations and creativity in the Tungabhadra cradle of Indian art. Along with about 30 ruins of Hindu temples that exist in Mahakuta, and numerous more in nearby sites of Badami, Aihole and others, it helps fix the relative decades and century for innovations that unfolded.

Notes

References

Bibliography
 
 
 , 
 , 
 
 
 
 
 
 K.V. Ramesh, Chalukyas of Vatapi, 1984, Agam Kala Prakashan, Delhi
 
 
 

Chalukya dynasty
Monuments and memorials in Karnataka
Monumental columns in India
Kannada inscriptions
7th-century inscriptions
Buildings and structures in Bagalkot district
Sanskrit inscriptions in India
Tourist attractions in Bagalkot district
Badami Chalukya inscriptions